Giles Eyre (c. 1635–1695) was an English barrister, member of parliament, and judge.

Giles Eyre may also refer to:
 Giles Eyre (priest) (1689–1749), Anglican priest in Ireland
 Giles Eyre (MP) (c. 1692–1750), English lawyer and member of parliament